France competed at the 2016 European Athletics Championships in Amsterdam, Netherlands, between 6 and 10 July 2016. A delegation of 61 athletes were send to represent the country.

Medals

Results

Men

Track & road events

Field Events

Combined events – Decathlon

Women

Track & road events

Field Events

Combined events – Heptathlon

References

European Athletics Championships
2016
Nations at the 2016 European Athletics Championships